Hell is a locale in Riverside County, California, United States, approximately  west of Blythe on Interstate 10.

Geography

As befits its name to many people, Hell has a climate stereotypical of a hot desert (Köppen classification BWh). In the absence of a weather station at the site of the defunct town, nearby Desert Center will suffice.

History
Hell was founded by Charles Carr in 1954. As of 1958 Carr, his wife, and their ten-year-old son Terry were the only inhabitants. Charles Carr served as the lone member of Hell's Chamber of Commerce.

Hell was abandoned in the late 1950s or early 1960s when it was isolated by the construction of U.S. Route 60 and U.S. 70. Its remains were demolished and burned by the California State Division of Highways in late 1964 to make way for what would eventually become Interstate 10. Before its demise, Hell had a service station, a beer tavern, and a good supply of drinking water.

Popular culture
Occasionally Hell was referenced in the press, typically in relation to the weather:
Columnist Art Ryon mentioned in his September 7, 1955, column in The Los Angeles Times that on September 1 it was 110 degrees in Los Angeles, yet only 105 degrees in Hell.
On October 17, 1958, The Los Angeles Times published an article, LA's Hotter Than Hell--Only 97 There, when Los Angeles reached 104 degrees the same day.
According to a UPI news report, it snowed in Hell at least once, causing many to remark, "it was a cold day in Hell".
On 2015, an Interstate 10 bridge 9 miles from Hell collapsed, leading The Los Angeles Times to report that "It's not the pit of Hell, but it's close".

There were several roadside signs referencing Hell, including one near Indio, California, which read, "100 miles of desert ahead--right through Hell".

In her book, Riverside County, California, Placenames: Their Origins and Their Stories, Jane Davies Gunther notes that Hell "was consigned to oblivion when the California State Highway Department bought it, rather than make an interchange for it, thus making it impossible for anyone to go to Hell in Riverside County".

A song entitled "Hell, Ca., Pop. 4" was featured on the 1990 album Blackout in the Red Room by Love/Hate.

See also
Hell, Michigan
Hell, Norway
Paradise, California

References

Bibliography
Gunther, Jane Davies. Riverside County Place Names: Their Origins and Their Stories, Rubidoux Printing Company, 1984. Library of Congress catalog number: 84-72920.

Citations and notes

Uncited references

 
 Ryon, Art (Sept. 7, 1955). "Ham on Ryon".  Los Angeles Times, p. A5.
 Times Correspondent (Apr. 4, 1958). "Rain? Even Hell Gets Inch Of It". Los Angeles Times, p. 2.
 Times Correspondent (Oct. 17, 1958). "LA's Hotter Than Hell—Only 97 There".  Los Angeles Times, p. 2.
 "Sign Theft Raises Cain Near Hell". (Jan. 1, 1967). Los Angeles Times, p. E4.
 UPI (Dec. 7, 1964). "No more Hell, courtesy of Highway Dept.". The (Oxnard) Press-Courier, p. 16.

Communities in Riverside County, California
Former settlements in Riverside County, California
Former populated places in California